Kızılcasöğüt (literally "Red willow") is a belde (town) in Banaz district of Uşak Province, Turkey. The population of Kızılcasöğüt is 2007  as of 2011. The town was founded 500 years ago. In 1977, it was declared a seat of township. Main crops of the town are cereals, lentil, gram, bean, hash and grapes. There are also carpenter shops in the town.

References

Populated places in Banaz District
Towns in Turkey